Ulex minor, the dwarf furze or dwarf gorse is an evergreen dwarf shrub in the family Fabaceae, native to eastern England, France, Spain and Portugal. It is restricted to lowland heathland habitats.

It is a low-growing shrub, forming small bushes or often growing mingled with heather.

The fruit is a legume (pod), partly enclosed by the pale brown remnants of the flower.

Due to its relatively soft spines, dwarf furze is readily grazed by livestock and wild herbivores.

The distributions of dwarf furze and its close relative western gorse (Ulex gallii) hardly overlap, even in similar habitats.

minor
Plants described in 1797